Brooke Amber Williams (born 23 December 1982) is a New Zealand netball player who plays as a center and wing attack. She has represented Samoa internationally as part of the Samoa national netball team. She is married to rugby league player Sione Lousi.

Williams played for the Western Flyers in the National Bank Cup. In 2019 she moved to Townsville, Australia with her partner Sione Lousi and began playing for the Northern Rays in the HART Sapphire Series.

Williams was part of the Samaon team for the 2007 World Netball Championships in Auckland, and later for the 2015 Netball World Cup. She was part of the bronze medal-winning team at the 2015 Pacific Games in Port Moresby, Papua New Guinea. She co-captained the team for the 2019 Netball World Cup alongside Gene Solia-Gibb. She retired from her international career after the 2019 world cup.

References

Living people
1982 births
New Zealand sportspeople of Samoan descent
New Zealand netball players
New Zealand expatriate sportspeople in Australia
Samoan netball players
2007 World Netball Championships players
2015 Netball World Cup players
2019 Netball World Cup players